Gaediopsis is a genus of flies in the family Tachinidae.

Species
G. flavipes Coquillett, 1895
G. lugubris (Wulp, 1890)
G. mexicana Brauer & von Bergenstamm, 1891
G. ocellaris Coquillett, 1902
G. organensis (Townsend, 1908)
G. rubentis (Reinhard, 1961)
G. setosa Coquillett, 1897
G. sierricola (Townsend, 1908)
G. vinnula (Reinhard, 1961)

References

Exoristinae
Diptera of North America
Tachinidae genera
Taxa named by Friedrich Moritz Brauer
Taxa named by Julius von Bergenstamm